The women's slopestyle competition of the 2011 FIS Snowboarding World Championships was held in La Molina, Spain on January 22, 2011. 27 athletes from 15 countries competed.

Results

Qualification
The following are the results of the qualification.

Final

References

Slopestyle, women's